Lawrence Martin is a Canadian journalist (currently columnist with The Globe and Mail), and the author of ten books on politics and sport. [1] Born in Edinburgh and raised in Hamilton, Ontario, he received a Bachelor of Arts in political science from that city's McMaster University and a Master of Public Administration from Harvard University.

Martin, who first reported for The Hamilton Spectator, has spent 34 years writing for The Globe and Mail where he began as a sports reporter in 1974. He served as the newspaper's Washington, D.C. correspondent bureau, as Montreal bureau chief and in 1985 he opened The Globe and Mail’s first Moscow bureau where he reported on the Gorbachev years in power.

Martin was national affairs columnist for the Southam chain from 1998 until 2001. He has been writing his Globe column since 2002. From 2017 to 2020, he was based in Washington covering the Trump administration.

His books, several of which have been national best sellers include a history of Canada-U.S. relations, The Presidents and The Prime Ministers; a two-volume biography of Jean Chretien; an account of the Gorbachev revolution called Breaking with History, a history of Russian hockey titled “The Red Machine.” He has also written biographies of Mario Lemieux, Lucien Bouchard and Stephen Harper.

His honours include two National Newspaper Award citations of merit. He is a recipient of McMaster University’s Lifetime Leadership Achievement Award.

References

 "The Globe & Mail Columnists". The Globe and Mail. Toronto. Retrieved 11 February 2010.
 Dowbiggin, Bruce (13 November 1993). "An unlovable team and a reclusive giant". Toronto Star. Retrieved 11 February 2010.
 "Johnston's on a real roll". Toronto Star. 18 October 1998. Retrieved 11 February 2010.
 "Harperland: The Politics of Control: Amazon.ca: Lawrence Martin: Books". www.amazon.ca. Retrieved 3 October 2010.
 "Harper's hatred surprised author". thechronicleherald.ca. Retrieved 3 October 2010.

1948 births
Living people
Harvard University alumni
Canadian biographers
Canadian male non-fiction writers
Male biographers
Canadian political journalists
McMaster University alumni
Journalists from Ontario
Writers from Hamilton, Ontario
Canadian people of British descent
Canadian people of Scottish descent
The Globe and Mail people